Zamia spartea is a species of plant in the family Zamiaceae. It is endemic to the Isthmus of Tehuantepec region of Chiapas state, southern Mexico, and may also exist in Oaxaca state. It is threatened by habitat loss.

References

spartea
Endemic flora of Mexico
Flora of Chiapas
Critically endangered plants
Endangered biota of Mexico
Taxonomy articles created by Polbot
Plants described in 1868